Monoblastia is a genus of lichens in the Monoblastiaceae family of fungi.

References

External links 

 Monoblastia at Index Fungorum

Eurotiomycetes
Lichen genera
Eurotiomycetes genera